RPWL is a German progressive rock band. Their music is distributed by their label Gentle Art of Music.

History
This band was formed in 1997 in Freising, Germany as a Pink Floyd cover band. The band's name is a combination of the first letters of the original four members' last names: Rissettio, Postl, Wallner, and Lang.

After three years, they began to make their own music based on their influences from their cover band era. Their debut album, God Has Failed, was met with international enthusiasm, praise and excellent reviews in all the major progressive rock music magazines.

2002 brought Trying To Kiss The Sun which saw the band developing more their own sound and not relying so heavily on their influences. They then released a compilation album called Stock in 2003. It was formed of the tracks that didn't make it onto their previous two albums, plus a cover of Syd Barrett's Opel, which the band used at shows as a soundcheck.

In 2005, they released their third studio album, World Through My Eyes. This was received well by fans, and off it came their first single, "Roses". This tune also featured the ex-Genesis and Stiltskin singer Ray Wilson on lead vocals. The special edition of the album was also mixed by Lang in 5.1 and was released as an SACD hybrid disc.

Later that year, the band released their first live album, Live: Start the Fire. The double disc album contains the whole of the band's Rockpalast concert, again featuring Ray Wilson on lead vocals for "Roses" and one other track, "Not About Us". This was a way for the band to pay tribute to Genesis, the other main band that had influenced them greatly apart from Pink Floyd.

On September 9, 2007, the band released 9, an album consisting of unreleased live songs and four brand new solo songs by Yogi Lang, Chris Postl, Manni Müller, and Kalle Wallner. The studio tracks are representative of the different influences within the band. 9 was released in a limited edition of 999 CDs and was only available from their website.

In February 2008, they released an album titled The RPWL Experience.  In 2016, the band released a live album containing a full performance of Pink Floyd's The Man & The Journey. 

During their 2022 tour, they announced the planned release of a new album in April of 2023.

Personnel

Members

Current members
 Yogi Lang – vocals, keyboards (1997–present)
 Kalle Wallner – guitars, bass (1997–present)
 Marc Turiaux – drums (2008–present)
 Markus Grützner - bass (2022-present)

Former members
 Chris Postl – bass (1997-2000, 2005-2010)
 Phil Paul Rissettio – drums (1997-2003)
 Stephan Ebner – bass (2000-2005)
 Andreas Wernthaler – keyboards (2000-2003)
 Manfred Müller – drums (2003-2008)
 Markus Jehle – keyboards (2005–2022)
 Werner Taus – bass (2010-2018)

Lineups

Discography
Studio albums
 God Has Failed (2000)
 Trying to Kiss the Sun (2002)
 World Through My Eyes (2005)
 The RPWL Experience (2008)
 Beyond Man and Time (2012)
 Wanted (2014)
 Tales from Outer Space (2019)
 Crime Scene (2023)

Live albums
 Start the Fire Live (2005)
 The RPWL Live Experience (2009)
 Nine (2009)
 A Show Beyond Man and Time (2013)
 RPWL plays Pink Floyd (2015)
 RPWL plays Pink Floyd - The Man and The Journey (2016)
 A New Dawn (2017)
 Live from Outer Space (2019)
 God Has Failed - Live & Personal (2021)

Compilations
 Stock (2003)
 The Gentle Art of Music (2010)

References

External links
 Official website of RPWL

German progressive rock groups